
Gmina Zembrzyce is a rural gmina (administrative district) in Sucha County, Lesser Poland Voivodeship, in southern Poland.

Villages
Gmina Zembrzyce contains the villages and settlements of Marcówka, Śleszowice, Tarnawa Dolna, Tarnawa Górna and Zembrzyce.

Neighbouring gminas
Gmina Zembrzyce is bordered by the town of Sucha Beskidzka and by the gminas of Budzów, Maków Podhalański, Mucharz, Stryszawa, Stryszów and Wadowice.

References
Polish official population figures 2006

Zembrzyce
Sucha County